The 18th Guards Assault Aviation Vitebsk twice Red Banner, the Order of Suvorov and the French Cross of the Order of the Legion of Honor Regiment "Normandie-Niemen" (18-й гвардейский штурмовой авиационный полк; 18th Guards ShAP) was a military unit of the Soviet Air Forces. It is now part of the Russian Air Force.

It was given the status of a Guards unit in accordance with a Prikaz of the NKO, No. 70 оf 07.03.1942. It fought in the Great Patriotic War, winning fame in France as it incorporated the Normandie-Niemen Free French flyers, and in the Korean War, later entering the Armed Forces of the Russian Federation. From March 1952 it was based at Galenki, Primorskiy Krai [44 05 49N, 131 48 12E] in the Russian Far East.

Its most recent form dates from March 1993 when it was reorganised as a штурмовой (literally "ground attack") unit, Military Unit Number 21806, being previously equipped with the Mikoyan-Gurevich MiG-27 "Flogger." During the 1990s and 2000s it was part of the 11th Air and Air Defence Forces Army.

It was amalgamated with the 187th Assault Aviation Regiment into the 6983rd Guards Aviation Base in December 2009, but then reformed at Chernigovka, Primorsky Krai, still in the Far East, in 2013. In 2019 it was reported as including two squadrons of Sukhoi Su-25 "Frogfoot."

References 

Regiments of the Russian Air Forces
Military units and formations established in 1993
Regiments of the Russian Air Force from 2014